Mega Man X: Command Mission, known in Japan as , is a video game developed by Capcom for the PlayStation 2 and Nintendo GameCube. The game is the spin-off to the Mega Man X franchise. It was first released in Japan on July 29, 2004, with releases in North America and Europe following that September and November. 

Command Mission takes place in the 23rd century, when a metallic substance called "Force Metal" is discovered that revolutionizes engineering for "Reploids", humanoid androids with human-level intelligence. When an assault on a Force Metal mining island occurs, a "Maverick Hunter" team led by X is sent out in response. Command Mission differs from previous entries in the series in that it is a turn-based role-playing game (RPG) rather than an action-platform game. Force Metal can be equipped to each playable character to gain special abilities.

The game was developed by many of the team members who previously worked on Capcom's Breath of Fire series of RPGs. According to the producer of Command Mission, a plot-focused RPG based on the Mega Man X games was created because the series is well known for its action and storyline. Command Mission was met with a mostly average critical response. Reviewers generally praised its battle system, but disagreed about its other aspects.

Plot

Mega Man X Command Mission takes place during an unspecified year in the 23rd century ("22XX AD"); about 100 years after the events of other games in the Mega Man X series. A new substance known as "Force Metal" is extracted from the debris of a small meteorite. Technology based on the metal revolutionizes the field of Reploid Engineering. Giga City, an artificial island in the middle of an ocean, is built entirely for the mining and smelting of Force Metal. Everything is well until a band of Reploids arm themselves and launch an assault on the island. Its leader, Epsilon, is branded a "Maverick" by the government, and a "Maverick Hunter" team is dispatched by Colonel Redips to Giga City in order to liberate it from the grasp of Epsilon's "Rebellion". X, Zero, and a Hunter named Shadow travel to the ruins. However, Shadow betrays the team and Epsilon's cadre appears and knocks Zero away.

X has no choice but to escape and gather a resistance team led by Chief R to assist in defeating the minions of the Rebellion Army. His new allies Spider, a bounty hunter who was originally hired to kill X; Steel Massimo, a Reploid who is the successor of the former Massimo who was destroyed by the Rebellion Army; Nana, a navigator who was abducted by Epsilon's forces; Marino, a thief interested in targeting trade secrets; and Cinnamon, a Reploid capable of producing Force Metal. X also reunites with Zero and his other ally, Axl, who is searching for somebody who possesses his own copy abilities. X's group manages to defeat the Rebellion Army but Spider presumably dies in the process. However, it is later revealed that Epsilon was not a Maverick, but Redips is instead. He and the presumably deceased Spider are revealed to be one and the same. X and his friends chase him to the top of the tower where he uses the Force Metal to take on a god-like form. Luckily for X's team, one of Epsilon's commanders, Ferham, helps the group by removing part of the Force Metal from Redips, giving X and company a chance to defeat him. With Great Redips weakened, X's party is able to finally defeat him.

Redips reverts to his original form. He berates the heroes for their unwillingness to evolve using Supra-Force Metal before dying. Ferham appears holding the Supra-Force Metal and apologizes to X for all the trouble she caused before leaping off the elevator, planning to self-destruct. The elevator then begins to crumble, forcing them to get inside to survive the fall back to Earth. Meanwhile, Nana watches from the Earth as Ferham destroys the Supra-Force Metal, creating a shower of aurora as it hits the atmosphere. Elsewhere, the heroes exit the fallen elevator, having landed in the middle of the ocean.

In epilogue narration, it is revealed that due to Colonel Redips' treason being unveiled to the public, Epsilon was posthumously cleared of his Maverick status, and peace returned to Giga City.

Gameplay

Unlike the action-platformers of the Mega Man X series, Command Mission is a turn-based RPG. The game follows a narrative that forces the player to go to the different stages in order, which abandons the stage select feature of many Mega Man X games. The action is split between a field screen and a battle screen, with the player always in the center of the field of view and with a map of the surrounding area in the bottom-right hand corner of the screen. Player spend their time in one of the situations described below. The hub area linked to Central Tower. From here, players transfer to the different Adventure Stages. They can visit previously completed Adventure Stages, as well as ones vital to progressing through the story. Similar to other Mega Man X games, stages are spread around Giga City, which have to be cleared to progress through the story. Most of the time, the adventure stages are "empty", with enemies appearing randomly throughout the level as with traditional RPGs.

Throughout the game, the player may come across abandoned robots. Collecting them enables the player to deploy robots to Adventure Stages, where they can then search for money, information, data or rare items. Some robots may require special parts in order to be used. As with many RPGs, characters or enemies can be induced to enter different states of affliction that may affect their performance during battle. These status effects can all be healed by "Cure One," or "Cure All"  except "DOA". Some names were changed due to the fact the characters are machines. The game features the appearance of Force Metals, special alloys from meteorites that fell from outer space. Reploids and robots equipped with Force Metals gain special abilities, however, the energy that these metals exude may have unwanted side effects if the character is overloaded past force metal tolerance. X and his companions can equip these Force Metals, which can be made from special recipes collected from Deployment Missions. However, they can only equip a certain number of Force Metals. They give Reploids special abilities. Exceeding the amount they can equip may lead to them becoming Maverick, which results in them starting battle with random afflictions including but not limited to the above. Finally, some Force Metals may cancel out the side-effects when equipped.

There are a few differences between the GameCube and PlayStation 2 versions of the game. The GameCube version makes use of the Nintendo GameCube Game Boy Advance Cable, in which players can connect a Game Boy Advance (GBA) to the GameCube, enabling the use of a special radar function to find secret items. A radar screen appears on the GBA screen, showing the immediate area around the player, the direction the player is facing and the location of any hidden items. The PlayStation 2 version features an unlockable demo of Mega Man X8 instead. The frequency of enemy encounters is higher in the GameCube version. Also, if a player takes too many turns to defeat an enemy, they experience penalties far quicker in the GameCube version than in the PlayStation 2 version.

Development and release
Command Mission was developed by Capcom Production Studio 3 and many of the team members that worked on Mega Man X7 and Breath of Fire: Dragon Quarter. Long-time producer and artist Keiji Inafune had always viewed the Mega Man X series in the action genre. He flatly refused when it was requested that he make it into an RPG. When asked why the team chose to make Mega Man X into an RPG, producer Tatsuya Kitabayashi explained, "Mega Man X is respected as an action game, but also has a good story. So we've decided to focus on the story, which is why I'm creating an RPG based on Mega Man X." Kitabayashi considered Command Mission a sequel rather side-story or the beginning of a new series because the plot is complete at the end of the game.

Based on their experience with the Breath of Fire series, the team created a new battle system for the game but found it difficult. "It's really difficult to create a battle mode system," Kitabayashi elaborated. "Mega Man has been about jumping and shooting in an action setting, so I needed to add a new system for this game. It was quite difficult to create something that is action-like but still has an RPG-like fighting mode." The new system was inspired by the "Whack-a-mole" game. When the game's production began, the Hyper Mode was exclusive to the playable characters X and Zero. However, because this gave them too large of an advantage over other party members, all other characters were given one Hyper Mode while X and Zero were given two each. This was mainly to balance the strength of each party member with Marino intiially standing out. Putting some restrictions on healing made things more interesting for the Capcom designer. Depleting the energy of the character's subtanks mean taht there was no way to restore the player's health anymore, making the game system more challenging. Cross Orders are used to mark the pace, but since action games are all about being good at them, they tried to make that into the decisive factor. As a result, the Action Triggers of Zero and Axl can be ugraded across the game. The Final Strike system was decided by the amount of playable characters and similarities with sentai-like works.

X's characterization was altered to give him a stronger persona now that he is a more iconic hero and leads several characters. In order to make him more appealing, the protagonist was also redesigned as the artists found his classic look too plain. Up until its development, the Mega Man series has focused more on male characters in the battlefield which led to the idea of including more female characters for a change. In regards to the antagonists, the narrative primarily explores the concept of how X and his allies face rebellious mechanical soldiers, Reploids, who become known as Maverick when they start causing crimes. In Command Mission, the team wanted to make the narrative properly explore the characterization of each Maverick as they have their own reasons for their crimes, most notably due to the concept of Force Metal that the protagonists wield in combat and the overuse can result into transforming them into Mavericks. THe villain antagonist was pointed out by the staff to have his motives to be have such role but the final boss was instead a character who loses his own self in the ending. The development also decided not to include a New Game Plus option because the game is an RPG rather than an action game. Instead, they included incredibly difficult, secret bosses that were originally part of the storyline.

Ryuji Higurashi, a veteran artist of the Mega Man X series, acted as the game's chief character designer. When he learned that the game was to take place in the same time period as the Mega Man Zero series, Higurashi added several features to his designs to Command Mission to reflect their relation. However, he was initially somewhat sceptical about the changes requested for the character X. The game's musical score was composed by Shinya Okada, Yuko Komiyama, and Seiko Kobuchi. A total of 58 tracks were compiled and released on a CD soundtrack by Suleputer in Japan on September 23, 2004. Asami Abe performed both the opening theme, "Jounetsu Setsuna" (A Moment of Passion), and the closing theme, "Parts". Mega Man X: Command Mission was first announced and presented by producer Koji Nakajima at the Tokyo Game Show in September 2003. The game was released in Japan on July 29, 2004; in North America on September 21, 2004; and in Europe on November 19, 2004. The North American PS2 version includes an unlockable demo version of Mega Man X8. To coincide with the release the launch of the game in North America, NubyTech announced Mega Man-themed game controllers for both console versions. However, only the GameCube version of the controller arrived with the release of Mega Man X Collection in early 2006.

Reception

Command Mission received mixed reviews from critics. The PS2 version currently holds a 69% on GameRankings and a 69 out of 100 on Metacritic, while the GameCube version holds slightly lower scores of 68% and 67 out of 100 respectively. Official Nintendo Magazine claimed Command Mission was a decent RPG with an "interesting" universe; however the staff found its genre too different from other entries in the Mega Man X series, which were platformers that required quick reflexes, and thus fans of the series used to the platform style would not enjoy it. X was praised by GameSpy due to the series giving him a more elaborated storyline and characterized him as a veteran. RPGFan regarded X as one of the best-written characters in Command Mission.

The battle system was generally praised, with the concept of pressing combinations of buttons to pull off techniques or improve a technique's power said to be one of the game's highlights. A common complaint has been the short length and linearity of the game. One reviewer stated that the game was "too far on the easy side". Though reviewers liked the cel-shaded and colorful look of the game, Phil Theobald of GameSpy noted that "most of the environments tend to be rather bland and end up looking a lot alike." Nintendo World Report was disappointed by X losing his trademark ability in this game of copying weapons, which is given to Axl.

Comparing the versions, IGN criticized that the GameCube version has a much higher random encounter rate, but also cited a smoother frame rate and marginal improvements in graphics. GameSpot called the GameCube version "a bit crisper". According to Famitsu, the PS2 version sold 36,635 units, making it the 312th best-selling game in the region for 2004. The GameCube version sold 18,599 units, making it the 460th best-selling game in Japan for that year.

References

External links
Capcom Global website
Official website 

Role-playing video games
GameCube games
Mega Man X games
PlayStation 2 games
Video games with cel-shaded animation
2004 video games
Works set in elevators
Video games set in the 22nd century
Video games developed in Japan
Superhero video games
Games with GameCube-GBA connectivity